From Cleveland 2 Cali is a compilation album from Bone Thugs-N-Harmony group member Flesh-N-Bone, introducing rappers signed to his record label, Flesh Bone Incorporated. There were only 1,000 copies printed up for the original release. This album has been long out of print.

Track listing
"Intro"
"Dead Ringer" (Afta Maff)
"Roof Is Leaking" (Flesh-n-Bone)
"Pump Pump" (Bar-Nun)
"Redemption" (Afta Maff)
"Mind Games" (Ms. Illegal)
"Mr. Playa Hata" (Bar-Nun)
"Death Before Dishonor" (Afta Maff featuring B.G. Knocc Out)
"AK Spray" (featuring Spice 1 & Flesh-n-Bone)
"Hardtimes" (featuring E Mortal Thugs and 2 Gun)
"Bar-Nun Kingdom" (Bar-Nun)
"Judged by 12, Then Carried by 6" (Layzie Bone)
"Hard Dick and Bubble Gum" (Afta Maff featuring D-Flex, Juice, Big Man and C-Note)
"What Chu Gone Do" (Afta Maff)

References

Flesh-n-Bone albums
1999 compilation albums
Gangsta rap compilation albums